Mark R. Charles is a Native American activist, public speaker, consultant, and author on Native American issues, as well as a journalist, blogger, Reformed pastor, and computer programmer. He was an independent candidate for President of the United States in the 2020 United States presidential election.

Early life
Charles, the son of a Navajo father and a Dutch-American mother, grew up in Gallup, New Mexico. He is a graduate of University of California, Los Angeles (UCLA).

Activism and career
As an activist, Charles is known for denouncing the doctrine of discovery and for his opposition to the Dakota Access Pipeline.

Charles is a former pastor at the Christian Indian Center in Denver, Colorado. He is a consultant for the Calvin Institute of Christian Worship, as well as the Washington, D.C., correspondent for Native News Online. Since 2008, he has written the blog Wirelesshogan: Reflections from the Hogan.

2020 presidential campaign
On May 28 2019, Charles announced via a YouTube video that he was running for President of the United States as an independent in the 2020 election. On August 20, he spoke at the Frank LaMere Native American Presidential Forum, alongside major candidates including Bernie Sanders, Elizabeth Warren, and Kamala Harris.

On July 25, 2020, Charles announced his choice of former Green Party Presidential candidate Sedinam Moyowasifza-Curry as his running mate. Less than three weeks later, On August 14, his campaign released a statement saying that Sedinam Moyowasifza-Curry had been dropped as Charles' running mate. On August 26, Charles announced that Adrian Wallace, Vice President of the Lexington NAACP and Chairman of the Kentucky State Conference of the NAACP, had been chosen as his running mate.

Charles had ballot access in Colorado with write-in access in several states. He received a total of 3,098 reported votes in the 2020 election, including 2,011 votes from ballot access and 1,087 reported votes from write-in access.

Personal life
Charles is a Christian. He was a pastor for a Christian Reformed Church for two years.

References

External links
Mark Charles 2020, official presidential campaign site
'We the People' - the three most misunderstood words in US history, Tedx Talk given by Charles
Wirelesshogan: Reflections from the Hogan, Charles' blog

Year of birth missing (living people)
Living people
21st-century Native Americans
American computer programmers
American bloggers
American male bloggers
American members of the Christian Reformed Church in North America
American people of Dutch descent
American anti-racism activists
Candidates in the 2020 United States presidential election
Native American activists
Native American journalists
Native Americans' rights activists
Navajo writers
New Mexico Independents
People from Gallup, New Mexico
Politicians from Denver
University of California, Los Angeles alumni
Washington, D.C., Independents